Charles D. Hyatt Jr. (February 28, 1908 – May 8, 1978) was a collegiate basketball player in the late 1920s.

The Syracuse, New York native played three seasons at University of Pittsburgh under coach Clifford Carlson (1927–30). An exceptional shooter, Hyatt scored then-outstanding 880 points throughout his college career. He was named an All-American three consecutive times, and additionally Helms Foundation Player of the Year in 1930, when he led the nation in scoring with 12.6 ppg.

After his college career, Hyatt played AAU basketball, and later coached in the Professional Basketball League of America. Hyatt was inducted into the Helms Athletic Foundation Hall of Fame, the Naismith Basketball Hall of Fame in its inaugural class in 1959, and the National Collegiate Basketball Hall of Fame in its inaugural class of 2006. In 2019, Charley Hyatt was posthumously inducted into the Pitt Athletics Hall of Fame.

References

1908 births
1978 deaths
All-American college men's basketball players
American men's basketball players
Basketball players from Syracuse, New York
Basketball players from Pennsylvania
Guards (basketball)
Naismith Memorial Basketball Hall of Fame inductees
National Collegiate Basketball Hall of Fame inductees
People from Uniontown, Pennsylvania
Phillips 66ers players
Pittsburgh Panthers men's basketball players
Professional Basketball League of America coaches